Amel Melih (born 6 October 1993) is an Algerian swimmer. She represented Algeria at the 2020 Summer Olympics. Her time of 25.77 in the women's 50m freestyle was not enough to advance out of the heats and she finished in 35th place overall. She finished 39th overall in the women's 100m freestyle with a time of 56.65. She was the flag bearer for Algeria during the opening ceremony along with Mohamed Flissi.

She represented Algeria at the 2022 Mediterranean Games held in Oran, Algeria.

References

External links
https://www.radioalgerie.dz/news/fr/tags/amel-melih
 

1993 births
Living people
Algerian female swimmers
Competitors at the 2011 All-Africa Games
Swimmers at the 2019 African Games
African Games medalists in swimming
African Games bronze medalists for Algeria
Swimmers at the 2020 Summer Olympics
French sportspeople of Algerian descent
Sportspeople from Lyon
Swimmers at the 2018 Mediterranean Games
Mediterranean Games competitors for Algeria
Swimmers at the 2010 Summer Youth Olympics
Islamic Solidarity Games medalists in swimming
20th-century Algerian women
21st-century Algerian women
Swimmers at the 2022 Mediterranean Games